The Lime Valley Covered Bridge or Strasburg Bridge is a covered bridge that spans Pequea Creek in Lancaster County, Pennsylvania, United States. A county-owned and maintained bridge, its official designation is the Pequea #8 Bridge.

The bridge has a single span, wooden, double Burr arch trusses design with the addition of steel hanger rods. The deck is made from oak planks.  It is painted red, the traditional color of Lancaster County covered bridges, on both the inside and outside. Both approaches to the bridge are painted in the traditional white color.

The bridge's WGCB Number is 38-36-23. Added in 1980, it is listed on the National Register of Historic Places as structure number 80003535. It is located at  (39.96067, -76.23500). The bridge is close to U.S. Route 222 southeast of Willow Street in West Lampeter Township, Pennsylvania.

History 
It was built in 1871 by either Joseph Cramer or Elias McMellen at a cost of $3,500.

Dimensions 
Length: 93 feet (28.3 m) span and  total length
Width: 13 (4.0 m) clear deck and  total width
Overhead clearance: 
Underclearance:

Gallery

See also
Burr arch truss
List of Lancaster County covered bridges

References 

Bridges completed in 1871
Covered bridges in Lancaster County, Pennsylvania
Covered bridges on the National Register of Historic Places in Pennsylvania
National Register of Historic Places in Lancaster County, Pennsylvania
Road bridges on the National Register of Historic Places in Pennsylvania
Wooden bridges in Pennsylvania
Burr Truss bridges in the United States